Audiopeach is the debut album by a British pop band Peach, released in 1998. The album was the only one released by the group (who were named Peach Union in the US) and contained the singles "On My Own", "From This Moment On" and "Sorrow Town".

In the US, the group achieved success with their debut single, "On My Own", which reached #39 in the Billboard Hot 100 It peaked at #1 in Israel and Mexico, and #2 in the Canadian Top 40.

Critical reception
Scripps News Service thought that "Peach Union reconciles sensual dance music with an effective dark mood, underscored by gloomy chords and [Lisa] Lamb's sometimes melancholy vocals." The Miami Herald wrote: "Think frothy ABBA-styled hooks with an eye toward the dance floor." The Stuart News declared: "Sweet, firm and ripe, the album celebrates and updates the glistening dance tunes and melodies of old-school '80s techno-pop auteurs like ABC, Human League, Thomas Dolby and Culture Club."

Track listing

References 

1997 debut albums